Beverly Smith (born November 16, 1946) in Cleveland, Ohio, is a Black feminist health advocate, writer, academic, theorist and activist who is also the twin sister of writer, publisher, activist and academic Barbara Smith. Beverly Smith is an instructor of Women's Health at the University of Massachusetts Boston.

She was one of three authors of the famous Combahee River Collective Statement, "one of the most widely read discussions of Black feminism," which was developed by members of the radical lesbian black feminist Combahee River Collective(CRC) in 1977. Her essays and articles on racism, feminism, identity politics and women's health have been extensively published in the United States.

Early life 
Beverly Smith was born on November 16, 1946 in Cleveland Ohio to Hilda Beall Smith. Her father, Gartrell Smith was not present during her childhood. Both twins were born prematurely and Smith suffered from pneumonia. Smith first lived in a two-bedroom house with her sister, mother, grandmother, and great-aunt. At the age of six, the twins and their family moved into a two-family house with her aunt and her aunt's husband.

Smith was raised in a full home that included her mother, grandmother, her aunt, and periodically, her aunt's husband. Growing up, her mother worked as a supermarket clerk, and Smith's grandmother became the twins primary caretaker. On October 16, 1956, Hilda passed away after being hospitalized for several months as a result of heart complications that originated from childhood rheumatic fever. Education was highly valued by the women in her family. Smith's mother had a Bachelor's of Science in Education from Fort Valley State University. While Hilda Beall Smith was the only family member to receive a university education, Smith's other family members worked as teachers.

Education 
Beverly Smith attended Bolton Elementary School before transferring to Robert Fulton Elementary school, Alexander Hamilton Jr. High School and John Adams High School. Smith graduated high school in January 1965. Following her graduation, Smith enrolled at University of Chicago later that year.

Beverly Smith received her undergraduate degree from the University of Chicago, and went on to receive a Masters of Public Health from Yale University and a Masters of Human Development and Psychology from Harvard Graduate School of Education.

The death of Smith's mother was the motivator for her to pursue public health in university, with a focus on Black women's health.

Early activism 
Smith became politically active when she was in high school and was involved in Congress of Racial Equality (CORE). At the time of her involvement with CORE, de facto segregation was a big issue with the school systems and her early activism involved picketing the school board and school boycotts. On the day of one of the boycotts, Smith and her sister attended one at a church nearby and read the Riot Act. After graduating high school, Smith became more involved with CORE with her sister and the two of them participated in canvassing. In April 1964, Smith was part of a protest in honor of Civil Rights activist Bruce Klunder in Cleveland, Ohio after his untimely death. Smith met Fannie Lou Hamer at a party after a rally in Cleveland. Smith was also involved with the Southern Christian Leadership Conference in 1967.

While attending the University of Chicago, Smith formed a support group with other Black students where they would talk about racism on campus. In her second year, Smith fell out of activism because the popularity of Black nationalism and Black separatism. In her third year, a friend of Barbara's transferred to the University of Chicago and invited Smith to a women's liberation meeting, where she became involved in political movements once again. While at university, Beverly Smith attended the speeches of Stokely Carmichael and Martin Luther King Jr.

Religion 
In her writings, Smith notes that religion and education "were twin pillars" in her home as she grew up. She was raised in the Baptist Church and attended Antioch Baptist Church, one of the oldest African American churches in Cleveland. Smith is a member of the First Parish of Watertown, a Unitarian Universalist church since 2014.

Career 
In 1973, Smith moved to New York City and became a writer for Ms. (magazine). Through networking at the National Black Feminist Organization (NBFO) conference in 1973, Smith met a woman who helped her land a job at the New York City Health and Hospitals Corporation doing research. During her Masters program, Smith worked various placements in health centres in Boston. After receiving her Masters in Public Health from Yale University in 1976, Smith worked at Boston City Hospital in women's health, focusing on contraceptive counselling. Smith has worked at Floating Hospital for Children.

Activism

Feminism 
While living in New York City, Beverly Smith became involved with organizations such as National Organization for Women and National Black Feminist Organization. She began attended NOW meetings in 1973 but soon stopped going as their focus was on white middle- and upper-class struggles. It was at the NBFO conference where Smith was able to relate to other Black women's experiences and called the conference "revelatory."

Smith credits her early career in women's health as influential to her feminist work. When working as a contraceptive counselor at Boston City Hospital, Beverly Smith was exposed to the state of women's healthcare and she then maintained a working relationship with a feminist health center in the area. Smith attended conferences speaking on Black and Third World women's health. She also worked with the Boston Committee on ending sterilization abuse. Beverly Smith was heavily involved in Black women's health advocacy, emphasizing the effect of racism and sexism on the Black woman's body. Much of her work focuses on reproductive health, diseases, mental health, Black women as health workers, sexuality, and violence against Black women and children.

On the subject of "the personal being political," Smith stated in a 1978 interview:"I think one of the major contributions the feminist movement - of this part of the feminist movement is of the personal being political. What that boils down to is that any situation in which there is an issue about power and control is by definition a political situation. So, you can have a political situation in your own kitchen, in your own bedroom, or in your own gynecologists office. You don't have to be talking about the houses of Congress or the Supreme Court to be talking about politics. Politics are, in a sense, obscured and taken out of the realm of everyday life. But that's where everyone lives their lives."Beverly Smith took part in the above interview as a member of the Boston Chapter Committee to End Sterilization Abuse. The interview was part of a segment regarding the impact of male physicians on women's healthcare and political issues surrounding women's healthcare and sex education.

Combahee River Collective 
The early stages of Combahee River Collective began in 1975 while Smith was living in Boston for her work placements at Boston City Hospital with her sister, Beverly Smith, and Demita Frazier. The collective began as the Boston chapter of the NFBO, but in 1975 became independent as a result of different political goals.

Beverly Smith, Barbara Smith, and Demita Frazier began writing the statement after they were asked by Barbara's friend, Zillah Eisenstein. The three women had been involved enough with various women's movements to understand that those movements were not addressing racism. The intersections of race, class and gender were critical to the collective when penning the statement. Smith attributes a portion of the development of Black feminism on the statement.

The politics of the collective were situated in anti-racism, classism, homophobia, and hetero-normativity. Smith and her group saw that Black feminism had the logic and rhetoric to combat the oppression of all women of color. The collective was also involved in advocating for abortion rights, and combating sterilization abuse and domestic violence. The CRC emphasized the importance of solidarity among Black women for liberation.

Legacy 
The Combahee River Collective Statement has had lasting impacts on Black Feminism and feminism. It coined terms such as interlocking oppression and Identity politics. CRC also gave Black and Brown women entry points into political involvement.

Selected works

Periodicals
 Conditions Five, The Black Women's Issue, November 1979;
 Conditions Four, Smith, Barbara, and Beverly. I Am Not Meant to be Alone and Without You Who Understand: Letters From Black Feminists, 1972-1978, Winter 1978 
 Sinister Wisdom - various issues
 Barbara Smith and Beverly Smith, "The Varied Voices of Black Women", Sojourner (magazine), October 1978.
 Ms. Magazine- various issues
 Aegis Journal, 1983, "Some Thoughts on Racism"

Anthologies
 Smith, Beverly. "The Wedding", in Home Girls: A Black Feminist Anthology, 1983, ed. Barbara Smith, Kitchen Table: Women of Color Press
 Combahee River Collective Statement, authored with Barbara Smith and Demita Frazier
 Smith, Barbara & Beverly. "Across the Kitchen Table: A Sister-to-Sister Dialogue", in This Bridge Called My Back: Writings by Radical Women of Color (eds), Cherríe Moraga and Gloria Anzaldúa, Persephone Press, 1981.
 Smith, Beverly. "Black Women's Health: Notes for a Course", in But Some of Us are Brave: Black Women's Studies, Hull, Gloria T., Scott, Patricia Bell, Smith, Barbara (eds), The Feminist Press, 1982. 
 Smith, Beverly. "Face-to-Face, Day-to-day — Racism Consciousness Raising", A conversation with Tia Cross, Freada Klein & Beverly Smith, in But Some of Us are Brave: Black Women's Studies, Hull, Gloria T., Scott, Patricia Bell, Smith, Barbara (eds), Feminist Press, 1982. 
 Smith, Beverly. "Choosing Ourselves: Black Women and Abortion", in From Abortion to Reproductive Freedom: Transforming a Movement, ed. Marlene Gerber Fried, South End Press, 1990, p. 86.

References

1946 births
Feminist studies scholars
Lesbian feminists
American lesbian writers
LGBT African Americans
African-American feminists
American feminists
Living people
American health activists
African-American women writers
African-American writers
American writers
Writers from Cleveland
University of Massachusetts Boston faculty
Activists from Ohio
Members of the Combahee River Collective
Yale School of Public Health alumni
Harvard Graduate School of Education alumni
American women academics
21st-century African-American people
21st-century African-American women
20th-century African-American people
21st-century American LGBT people
20th-century African-American women